Dynein axonemal intermediate chain 1 is a protein that in humans is encoded by the DNAI1 gene.

The inner- and outer-arm dyneins, which bridge between the doublet microtubules in axonemes, are the force-generating proteins responsible for the sliding movement in axonemes. The intermediate and light chains, thought to form the base of the dynein arm, help mediate attachment and may also participate in regulating dynein activity. This gene encodes an intermediate chain dynein, belonging to the large family of motor proteins. Mutations in this gene result in abnormal ciliary ultrastructure and function associated with primary ciliary dyskinesia (PCD) and Kartagener syndrome. The DNAI1 gene is involved in the development of proper respiratory function, motility of spermatozoa, and asymmetrical organization of the viscera during embryogenesis. This gene affects these three very different aspects of development because all three are dependent on proper cilia function. DNAI1 codes for the development of cilia ultrastructure in the upper and lower respiratory tracts, spermatozoa flagellae, and nodal cilia (cilia of the primitive node). DNAI1 specifically encodes for an intermediate chain of the outer dynein arm. Each dynein arm of the ciliary axoneme has an inner and outer dynein arm. A mutation in DNAI1 can lead to defective ciliary beating. A DNAI1 gene mutation accounts for 4-10% of all cases of primary ciliary dyskensia (PCD). The most frequent structural defect in cilia of PCD patients are abnormal dynein arms. A common mutation of DNAI1 leading to PCD is a hot-spot mutation in intron 1 of the gene. Mutations in coding or splicing are only found in 10% of PCD cases.

References

External links
 GeneReviews/NIH/NCBI/UW entry on Primary Ciliary Dyskinesia

Further reading